The Harris Company was a retail corporation, based in San Bernardino, California, that operated a chain of department stores named Harris', all in Southern California.  Philip, Arthur, and Herman Harris - nephews of founder Leopold Harris of what was once the large Los Angeles-based chain Harris & Frank – started the company with a small dry goods store in 1905, and the company eventually grew to nine large department stores, with stores in San Bernardino, Riverside, and Kern Counties.

The chain was acquired by Fresno, California-based Gottschalks in 1998.  After the acquisition some of the stores continued to operate under the name Harris Gottschalks.  In January, 2009, Gottschalks filed for bankruptcy, and on March 31 announced they were liquidating all stores.  All of the original Harris stores that were still operating, were finally closed in July, 2009.

History

Origins
Philip, Arthur, and Herman Harris were nephews of Leopold Harris, founder of what was once the large Los Angeles-based chain Harris & Frank; and Philip and Herman had worked there.

Philip and Herman closed their White House store at 103 W. 4th Street in Santa Ana and brought the stock to San Bernardino. Arthur Harris joined in 1906, after having worked in his brother-in-law's store in Anaheim. With $2,500 of Arthur's money, Harris Co. moved across the street. The Harris brothers hired a window trimmer and a dozen employees, and became the most stylish store in town. In 1907, they opened a second floor to house Millinery and Ready-to-Wear. In 1907, they added what was the first elevator in San Bernardino. They opened a branch in Colton, without success, and in 1908, a branch in Redlands, which was successful. By 1915, the flagship store had annexed what was the Cartwright's Dry Goods building, as well as a clothing store.

Flagship
By 1919 they started to buy land at 3rd and E to build a new, larger store, which launched on November 7, 1927, with three floors plus a mezzanine, basement and roof garden. There was a tea room, lunch counter, beauty parlor, barber shop, sit-down soda fountain, candies, stationery, grocery store called Sage's Market, and a restaurant, Café Madrid. The main entrance archway fitted with Italian marble rose 29 feet, while the interior lobby ceiling was an impressive 32 feet high; the doors were made of hammered copper. The outside face of the building had alternating intricate stone and wrought iron ornamental grillwork, with the Harris coat-of-arms molded into the stonework. The San Bernardino Sun wrote: Towns do not have department stores. The Inland Empire has arrived."

1930s–1970s
The company survived the Depression by carefully managing costs and business relationships. Through the 1940s and '50s, the store was famous for its animated Christmas window displays on E Street and its Santa Claus. In 1947, the store added the first escalator (then called a "motorstair") in the Inland Empire. 
Harris continued to expand their San Bernardino and Redlands stores and opened a branch at Riverside Plaza on September 30, 1957.

With suburbanization, San Bernardino sought to revitalize its downtown. In the late 1960s and early 1970s, due to the Central City redevelopment program, structural changes were carried out at the flagship in the name of modernization and it became an anchor store of the new Central City Mall

1980s–2009
In 1981, Spanish retailer El Corte Inglés, S.A. acquired the Harris Company and its nine stores which included Bakersfield, Hemet, Indio, Moreno Valley, Palmdale, Redlands, Riverside, San Bernardino and Victorville.  In 1997, the Harris Company invested $27 million to update its nine-store chain.

The Harris Company was acquired by Gottschalks in 1998, and the stores were initially renamed Harris-Gottschalks. Most of the original Harris stores eventually dropped the name Harris, except the Bakersfield, Indio and Moreno Valley locations, which continued to operate under the Harris-Gottschalks name. The original flagship store in downtown San Bernardino closed on January 31, 1999. After the downtown San Bernardino store closed, the Riverside store became the largest store in the chain at 204,000 square feet.

On January 14, 2009, Gottschalks filed for Chapter 11 bankruptcy. In March 2009, Gottschalks announced that it had lined up a group of bidders to liquidate the chain, if a buyer was not found by March 30. On March 31, Gottschalks announced it would liquidate its remaining stores, and on July 12, 2009 all of the Gottschalks stores were closed.

Holiday seasons 
The original Harris Company store in downtown San Bernardino and adjacent to Carousel Mall is still remembered today for its magnificent Christmas and Easter promotional displays. The family likewise provided lavish holiday decor for its Riverside store and later others, including creative, automated window displays, which became a local tradition for shoppers.  This continued until 1998, long after most other stores cut back on lavish displays.

Store locations 
Located on E Street in downtown San Bernardino, the original Harris Company building remains vacant as of November, 2021.

The largest location in the former Harris chain was the  location at the Riverside Plaza in Riverside, California. This store was also the largest store in the Gottschalks chain.  The store was purchased by clothing retailer Forever 21 which opened a new large-format store at the site in August, 2009. The former Riverside Harris' was renovated in 2014 after the closure of Forever 21 in early 2013. It is now occupied by Nordstrom Rack, Marshalls, and Jo-Ann Fabrics

Table of store locations:

See also
Gottschalks

References

San Bernardino, California
Defunct department stores based in Greater Los Angeles
Companies based in San Bernardino County, California
Retail companies established in 1905
Retail companies disestablished in 1998
Economy of Riverside, California
1905 establishments in California